The 2013 UCI Women's Road Rankings is an overview of the UCI Women's Road Rankings, based upon the results in all UCI-sanctioned races of the 2013 women's road cycling season.

Summary

Final results.

Individual World Ranking (top 100)

Final results.

UCI Teams Ranking

This is the ranking of the UCI women's teams from 2013.

Final results.

Nations Ranking 

Final results.

References

2013 in women's road cycling
UCI Women's Road World Rankings